Ligament of the head of the fibula may refer to:

 Anterior ligament of the head of the fibula
 Posterior ligament of the head of the fibula